The Indonesian Television Awards (abbreviated as ITA) is an annual awards for the most popular television program, television personality and musician in Indonesia. It based on a poll of viewers' top of mind regarding television programs in Indonesia conducted in 22 cities from 17 provinces in Indonesia by Roy Morgan Research. The award was first held in 2016 and broadcast by RCTI and MNCTV.

A total of 12 categories were selected from the results of a survey conducted by the Roy Morgan Research and Provetic team based on a direct survey among the community in 22 cities in 17 provinces. According to Roy Morgan's Client Service Director Ningsih Soemitro, Roy Morgan conducted a direct survey to television viewers to find out which television programs were favorites, seen from top of mind or remembered spontaneously by viewers.

The 2018 edition of the award won the 2018 Panasonic Gobel Awards for the most favorite television special program.

See also 
 List of Asian television awards

References

External links 
 

Indonesian television awards
Awards established in 2016